In geometry, an incidence relation is a heterogeneous relation that captures the idea being expressed when phrases such as "a point lies on a line" or "a line is contained in a plane" are used. The most basic incidence relation is that between a point, and a line, sometimes denoted . If  the pair  is called a flag. There are many expressions used in common language to describe incidence (for example, a line passes through a point, a point lies in a plane, etc.) but the term "incidence" is preferred because it does not have the additional connotations that these other terms have, and it can be used in a symmetric manner. Statements such as "line  intersects line " are also statements about incidence relations, but in this case, it is because this is a shorthand way of saying that "there exists a point  that is incident with both line  and line ". When one type of object can be thought of as a set of the other type of object (viz., a plane is a set of points) then an incidence relation may be viewed as containment.

Statements such as "any two lines in a plane meet" are called incidence propositions. This particular statement is true in a projective plane, though not true in the Euclidean plane where lines may be parallel. Historically, projective geometry was developed in order to make the propositions of incidence true without exceptions, such as those caused by the existence of parallels. From the point of view of synthetic geometry,  projective geometry should be developed using such propositions as axioms. This is most significant for projective planes due to the universal validity of Desargues' theorem in higher dimensions.

In contrast, the analytic approach is to define projective space based on linear algebra and utilizing homogeneous co-ordinates.

However these computations can be naturally extended to higher-dimensional projective spaces, and the field may be replaced by a division ring (or skewfield) provided that one pays attention to the fact that multiplication is not commutative in that case.

Let  be the three-dimensional vector space defined over the field . Incidence of a point and a line is given by containment of the one-dimensional subspace in the two-dimensional subspace.

Fix a basis for  so that we may describe its vectors as coordinate triples (with respect to that basis). A one-dimensional vector subspace consists of a non-zero vector and all of its scalar multiples. The non-zero scalar multiples, written as coordinate triples, are the homogeneous coordinates of the given point, called point coordinates. This line may be denoted by line coordinates , which are also homogeneous coordinates since non-zero scalar multiples would give the same line. Other notations are also widely used. Point coordinates may be written as column vectors, T, with colons, or with a subscript, . Correspondingly, line coordinates may be written as row vectors, with colons,  or with a subscript, . Other variations are also possible.

Incidence expressed algebraically

Given a point  and a line , written in terms of point and line coordinates, the point is incident with the line (often written as ), if and only if,

 .

This can be expressed in other notations as:

No matter what notation is employed, when the homogeneous coordinates of the point and line are just considered as ordered triples, their incidence is expressed as having their dot product equal 0.

The line incident with a pair of distinct points
Let  and  be a pair of distinct points with homogeneous coordinates  and  respectively. These points determine a unique line  with an equation of the form  and must satisfy the equations:
  and
 . 
In matrix form this system of simultaneous linear equations can be expressed as:

This system has a nontrivial solution if and only if the determinant,
 
Expansion of this determinantal equation produces a homogeneous linear equation, which must be the equation of line . Therefore, up to a common non-zero constant factor we have  where:
 ,
 , and
 .

In terms of the scalar triple product notation for vectors, the equation of this line may be written as:
 ,
where  is a generic point.

Collinearity

Points that are incident with the same line are said to be collinear. The set of all points incident with the same line is called a range.

i.e., if and only if the determinant of the homogeneous coordinates of the points is equal to zero.

Intersection of a pair of lines

Let  and  be a pair of distinct lines.
  and
 .
The solution of this system gives:
 ,
 , and
 .

Alternatively, consider another line  passing through the point , that is, the homogeneous coordinates of  satisfy the equation:
.  
Combining this equation with the two that define , we can seek a non-trivial solution of the matrix equation:

Such a solution exists provided the determinant,
 

The equation of the generic line passing through the point  in scalar triple product notation is:
 .

Concurrence
Lines that meet at the same point are said to be concurrent. The set of all lines in a plane incident with the same point is called a pencil of lines centered at that point. The computation of the intersection of two lines shows that the entire pencil of lines centered at a point is determined by any two of the lines that intersect at that point. It immediately follows that the algebraic condition for three lines,  to be concurrent is that the determinant,

See also
 Menelaus theorem
 Ceva's theorem
 Concyclic
 Incidence matrix
 Incidence algebra
 Incidence structure
 Incidence geometry 
 Levi graph
 Hilbert's axioms

References

 Harold L. Dorwart (1966) The Geometry of Incidence, Prentice Hall.

Projective geometry
Articles containing proofs